Dirk van Duijvenbode (born 30 June 1992) is a Dutch professional darts player who plays in Professional Darts Corporation (PDC) events. He is known for his energetic walk-on, combined with hardstyle music. More recently, he has become known for his job with an aubergine company, which has led to him having the nickname 'Aubergenius'.

Career

Early Career: 2011-2017 
In 2011, van Duijvenbode reached the final of a German PDC Youth Tour event, losing 2–4 against Paul Barham. In 2013, he won through to the final of two Challenge Tour events but was beaten 1–4 by Rowby-John Rodriguez and 3–4 by Jan Dekker. 

Van Duijvenbode began playing in main PDC events in 2014 and qualified for the German Darts Championship, where he beat Brian Woods 6–3 before losing 5–6 to Wes Newton, having been 5–3 ahead. He reached the quarter-finals of a PDC event for the first time at the fourth UK Open Qualifier by defeating Robert Thornton 6–4, but then lost by a reverse of this scoreline to Brendan Dolan. At the UK Open itself he beat John Bowles 5–1 and, despite at one time holding a 7–4 lead over Joe Murnan in third round, was then edged out 8–9. Van Duijvenbode progressed to the semi-finals of the World Youth Championship, but lost 2–6 against Keegan Brown. He was defeated 1–5 by Colin Fowler in the final of the penultimate Challenge Tour event of the year.

In 2015, van Duijvenbode hit his first nine-dart finish during the third Development Tour event after he wired double 12 for a perfect leg in his previous match. His first quarter-final of the year on the main tour came at the 12th Players Championship where he lost 2–6 to Michael Smith. Van Duijvenbode made his debut at the European Championship, but was knocked out 2–6 by Justin Pipe in the first round.

Van Duijvenbode made his first appearance in the PDC World Championship in the 2016 event and lost the first set against compatriot Raymond van Barneveld in the first round. The next went to a deciding leg, but when van Duijvenbode was on 180 he hit three treble 20s to bust his score and could not win another leg in a 3-0 loss. At the UK Open he enjoyed wins over Michael McFall, Peter Hudson and Robbie Green to play in the fourth round and was defeated 4–9 by Mark Webster. During the rest of the season, the best van Duijvenbode could do was reach the last 32 of three Players Championship events.

2018-2020 
After winning his Tour Card back at the start of 2018 only to lose it after his two-year spell, van Duijvenbode won a Tour Card for the third time at 2020 European Q-School. On 9 February 2020, he made his first ever PDC semi-final, losing 4–7 to Gerwyn Price at the Players Championship 2. He also reached the semi-final of the 2020 Belgian Darts Championship. Van Duijvenbode's strong start to the 2020 PDC Pro Tour helped him qualify for the 2020 World Grand Prix, where despite being a debutant and the lowest-ranked qualifier on the Order of Merit, he defeated top 16 players Mensur Suljović, Dimitri Van den Bergh, Gary Anderson & Simon Whitlock to reach his first televised final, where he was defeated by Gerwyn Price. His strong performances on the Pro Tour this year were enough to earn him a spot at the World Championship for the first time in 5 years.

2021 
At the 2021 World Championship, van Duijvenbode came back from 2 sets behind to beat Bradley Brooks 3-2 in the first round, and then beat the fifth seed Rob Cross in the second. In the third round he whitewashed Adam Hunt 4-0, to set up a tie with Glen Durrant in the last 16. Although he lost the first 2 sets to Durrant, he won the match 4-3 to progress to the quarter-finals, where he was beaten by Gary Anderson by 5 sets to 1, ending his run. However, this performance was enough to see him reach the world's top 32 for the first time in his career. 2021 also saw van Duijvenbode pick up his first ranking tournament win in the PDC with a Players Championship final win against fellow Dutchman Martijn Kleermaker.

2022 
Despite a successful 2021 campaign, van Duijvenbode did not begin 2022 on form, and was defeated in the fourth round at the 2022 PDC World Darts Championship by eventual quarter-finalist Gerwyn Price. However, he maintained a consistently high standard of play on the PDC Pro Tour, and has also won two Players Championship events so far in the year 2022. His appearance at the 2022 World Matchplay was just his second appearance at the event to date, and he entered the event as the 14th seed based on his then-current PDC Order of Merit ranking. In the Matchplay, he defeated Ryan Searle and world number 3 Michael Smith before losing to his 2022 PDC World Cup teammate Danny Noppert 16-11 in the quarter-final stage. According to the PDC statistical website Darts Orakel, van Duijvenbode recently usurped José de Sousa as the current most prolific 180 hitter on the PDC circuit, averaging one maximum every 0.378 legs of darts in the last calendar year.  Based on his recent tournament wins and performance in the Matchplay, van Duijvenbode is currently ranked 5th in the Players Championship Order of Merit and 12th in the overall PDC Order of Merit. The latter is a career-high ranking for the Dutchman.

World Championship results

PDC
 2016: First round (lost to Raymond van Barneveld 0–3)
 2021: Quarter-finals (lost to Gary Anderson 1–5)
 2022: Fourth round (lost to Gerwyn Price 1–4)
 2023: Fourth round (lost to Michael van Gerwen 1–4)

Career finals

PDC major finals: 2 (2 runners-up)

PDC world series finals: 1 (1 runner-up)

Performance timeline

PDC European Tour

Notes

References

External links

{{#ifexpr:<21|}}

1992 births
Living people
Dutch darts players
British Darts Organisation players
Professional Darts Corporation current tour card holders
Sportspeople from Katwijk
PDC World Cup of Darts Dutch team